YouCut was a program started by Republican Congressman and House Majority Leader Eric Cantor in May 2010 to present ideas for potential cost-cutting bills to be presented to the House of Representatives of the United States, and to solicit feedback on those ideas from the public. The program consisted of a website offering ideas for visitors to vote on, and presents video of congress members discussing the winning ideas on the House floor.

Cantor defended the program, stating that the goal is "to change the culture in Washington".The release date of this program is 2010.

See also
Tax choice

References

Republican Party (United States) campaigns
Crowdsourcing